Buster Bronco is the official mascot of Boise State University.

Buster Bronco, is a person in a brown bronco costume with a large head and an open mouth. Buster Bronco wears #0.

The idea to have a Bronco as a mascot originated in 1932 by Boise State Junior College Students.Buster Becomes A Bronco is a children's book based on Buster Bronco that was published in 2008.

Buster Bronco was ranked third on the Sports Illustrated Power Mascot Rankings in 2007. Buster was also a candidate for the Capitol One Mascot of the Year for the 2008–2009 season.

See also
 Buster Bronco is also the name of the mascot of Western Michigan University.
 The Denver Broncos' mascot is a live horse.

References

Mountain West Conference mascots
Boise State Broncos
Fictional horses